Pride: A Tribute to Charley Pride is an album by American country music singer Neal McCoy. It was released on September 24, 2013. The album is a tribute to Charley Pride, featuring covers of Pride's songs. Darius Rucker, Raul Malo, and Trace Adkins are featured performers.

Track listing
"Is Anybody Goin' to San Antone" (Dave Kirby, Glenn Martin) - 3:30
"I'm Just Me" (Martin) - 2:57
featuring Raul Malo
"Kiss an Angel Good Mornin'" (Ben Peters) - 3:06
featuring Darius Rucker
"Kaw-Liga" (Hank Williams, Fred Rose) - 3:54
"You're So Good When You're Bad" (Peters) - 3:35
"It's Gonna Take a Little Bit Longer" (Peters) - 2:47
"Roll On Mississippi" (Kye Fleming, Dennis Morgan) - 3:52
featuring Trace Adkins
"Just Between You And Me" (Jack Clement) - 3:07
"Mountain of Love" (Harold Dorman) - 3:15
"Someone Loves You Honey" (Don Devaney) - 3:03
"You're My Jamaica" (Kent Robbins) - 4:13

Personnel
Trace Adkins - vocals on "Roll On Mississippi"
David Angell - violin
Robert Bailey Jr. - background vocals
J.T. Corenflos - electric guitar
Dennis Crouch - upright bass
Eric Darken - percussion
David Davidson - violin
Mark Douthit - baritone saxophone, tenor saxophone
Jenee Fleenor - fiddle
Paul Franklin - dobro, steel guitar
Garth Fundis - horn arrangements, background vocals
Barry Green - trombone
Vicki Hampton - background vocals
Wes Hightower - background vocals
Anthony LaMarchina - cello
Chris Leuzinger - electric slide guitar
B. James Lowry - acoustic guitar
Raul Malo - vocals on "I'm Just Me"
Neal McCoy - lead vocals
Greg Morrow - drums, percussion
Russ Pahl - electric guitar, steel guitar, mandolin
Steve Patrick - trumpet
Becky Priest - background vocals
Mickey Raphael - harmonica
Mike Rojas - keyboards
Darius Rucker - vocals on "Kiss An Angel Good Mornin'"
Pamela Sixfon - violin
Jimmie Lee Sloas - bass guitar
Jeff Taylor - accordion
Mary Katherine Van Osdale - violin
Kris Wilkinson - viola, string arrangements

Chart performance

References

2013 albums
Neal McCoy albums
Charley Pride tribute albums
Albums produced by Garth Fundis